Cameron G. Stewart (born September 18, 1971) is a Canadian professional ice hockey coach and former player. He played in the National Hockey League with the Boston Bruins, Florida Panthers, and Minnesota Wild between 1993 and 2001.

Playing career
Stewart played college hockey at the University of Michigan. Stewart started his NHL career with the Boston Bruins in 1993. He would also play with the Florida Panthers, and was an original member of the expansion Minnesota Wild. 

In the minor leagues, Stewart played for the Providence Bruins (AHL), Cincinnati Cyclones (IHL), and Houston Aeros (IHL). He helped the Houston Aeros win a Turner Cup in the 1998–1999 season.

Post-playing career
Stewart retired from ice hockey due to problems he was experiencing from a concussion that he received while playing. Stewart went on to be an assistant coach/front-office advisor with the Houston Aeros (now the Iowa Wild). He later became head coach of the St. Mikes Buzzers in the OPJHL.

Stewart is currently an Ontario-based agent with the KO Sports Agency, overseeing player development.

Career statistics

Regular season and playoffs

External links
 

1971 births
Living people
Boston Bruins draft picks
Boston Bruins players
Canadian ice hockey left wingers
Cincinnati Cyclones (IHL) players
Florida Panthers players
Houston Aeros (1994–2013) players
Ice hockey people from Ontario
Michigan Wolverines men's ice hockey players
Minnesota Wild players
Providence Bruins players
Sportspeople from Kitchener, Ontario